The Wimp & The Wild is the fourth and final album by John Otway & Wild Willy Barrett, released in 1989.

History
The writing process for The Wimp & The Wild goes back 10 years. "Best Dream" is a re-recording of the Where Did I Go Right track.

Critical reception
AllMusic wrote that "within its corridors lurk some of Otway's finest performances of the age, beginning with an almost heartbreakingly Spartan revision of 'Best Dream.'" Martin C. Strong wrote that the album "ranged from 'wimp-ish' acoustics from John to stripped-down covers."

Track listing

Personnel
John Otway - vocals, guitar
Wild Willy Barrett - guitar, bass, drums, drum pads, programming
Liam Grundy - piano on "Separated"

References

1989 albums
John Otway albums